Beddes is a commune in the Cher department in the Centre-Val de Loire region of France.

Geography
The commune shares a border with the department of Indre.

Population

Places of interest
 The church of St.Martin, dating from the nineteenth century.
 A watermill

See also
Communes of the Cher department

References

Communes of Cher (department)